"Don't Give Up on Me" is a song by American singer-songwriter Andy Grammer. It was released on February 13, 2019 as lead single from his fourth studio album, Naive which was released on June 25, 2019. Grammer wrote the song with Bram Inscore, Jake Torrey and Sam Farrar; Inscore produced it. On April 12, 2019, Grammer released another version with Dutch DJ R3hab.

Content
"Don't Give Up on Me" is the theme song of 2019 romantic drama film Five Feet Apart. It is about a young man and woman living in the entanglement of illness, death and love. The lyrics speaks to the heroine's mission and echo the sentiment of her. Grammer said in an interview, "Don't give up on me'… a very simple idea but a very powerful one. I have had many moments in my life where I wouldn't give up on someone else, where I believed in them when they didn't believe in themselves. Hell, I've had super intense moments where I wouldn't give up on myself. But the most powerful memories from my personal vantage point are when someone wouldn't give up on me. It is my sincere wish that for anyone who hears this song and is on the verge of giving up it will be another subtle nudge to keep going."

Composition
The song is written in the key of C minor and has a tempo of 113 beats per minute. The version with R3hab is written in the key of E♭ Major, with a tempo of 121 beats per minute.

In January 2020, Grammer recorded a new version with Jerusalem Youth Chorus.

Charts

Weekly charts

Year-end charts

Certifications

Release history

References

2019 songs
2019 singles
Andy Grammer songs
R3hab songs
Hollywood Records singles
Songs written by Andy Grammer
Songs written by Sam Farrar
Songs written for films